In axiomatic set theory and the branches of mathematics and philosophy that use it, the axiom of infinity is one of the axioms of Zermelo–Fraenkel set theory.  It guarantees the existence of at least one infinite set, namely a set containing the natural numbers. It was first published by Ernst Zermelo as part of his set theory in 1908.

Formal statement 
In the formal language of the Zermelo–Fraenkel axioms, the axiom reads:

In words, there is a set I (the set which is postulated to be infinite), such that the empty set is in I, and such that whenever any x is a member of I, the set formed by taking the union of x with its singleton {x} is also a member of I. Such a set is sometimes called an inductive set.

Interpretation and consequences 
This axiom is closely related to the von Neumann construction of the natural numbers in set theory, in which the successor of x is defined as x ∪ {x}. If x is a set, then it follows from the other axioms of set theory that this successor is also a uniquely defined set. Successors are used to define the usual set-theoretic encoding of the natural numbers.  In this encoding, zero is the empty set:

0 = {}.

The number 1 is the successor of 0:

1 = 0 ∪ {0} = {} ∪ {0} = {0} = {{}}.

Likewise, 2 is the successor of 1:

2 = 1 ∪ {1} = {0} ∪ {1} = {0,1} = { {}, {{}} },

and so on:

3 = {0,1,2} = { {}, {{}}, {{}, {{}}} };

4 = {0,1,2,3} = { {}, {{}}, { {}, {{}} }, { {}, {{}}, {{}, {{}}} } }.

A consequence of this definition is that every natural number is equal to the set of all preceding natural numbers. The count of elements in each set, at the top level, is the same as the represented natural number, and the nesting depth of the most deeply nested empty set {}, including its nesting in the set that represents the number of which it is a part, is also equal to the natural number that the set represents. 

This construction forms the natural numbers. However, the other axioms are insufficient to prove the existence of the set of all natural numbers, . Therefore, its existence is taken as an axiom – the axiom of infinity. This axiom asserts that there is a set I that contains 0 and is closed under the operation of taking the successor; that is, for each element of I, the successor of that element is also in I.

Thus the essence of the axiom is:

There is a set, I, that includes all the natural numbers.

The axiom of infinity is also one of the von Neumann–Bernays–Gödel axioms.

Extracting the natural numbers from the infinite set 
The infinite set I is a superset of the natural numbers. To show that the natural numbers themselves constitute a set, the axiom schema of specification can be applied to remove unwanted elements, leaving the set N of all natural numbers. This set is unique by the axiom of extensionality.

To extract the natural numbers, we need a definition of which sets are natural numbers. The natural numbers can be defined in a way which does not assume any axioms except the axiom of extensionality and the axiom of induction—a natural number is either zero or a successor and each of its elements is either zero or a successor of another of its elements. In formal language, the definition says:

Or, even more formally:

Alternative method 
An alternative method is the following.  Let  be the formula that says "x is inductive"; i.e. .  Informally, what we will do is take the intersection of all inductive sets.  More formally, we wish to prove the existence of a unique set  such that

  (*)

For existence, we will use the Axiom of Infinity combined with the Axiom schema of specification. Let  be an inductive set guaranteed by the Axiom of Infinity.

For uniqueness, first note that any set which satisfies (*) is itself inductive, since 0 is in all inductive sets, and if an element  is in all inductive sets, then by the inductive property so is its successor.  Thus if there were another set  which satisfied (*) we would have that  since  is inductive, and  since  is inductive.  Thus .  Let  denote this unique element.

This definition is convenient because the principle of induction immediately follows:  If  is inductive, then also , so that .

Thus they both completely determine isomorphic systems, and since they are isomorphic under the identity map, they must in fact be equal.

An apparently weaker version 
Some old texts use an apparently weaker version of the axiom of infinity, to wit:

This says that there is an element in x and for every element y of x there is another element of x which is a strict superset of y. This implies that x is an infinite set without saying much about its structure. However, with the help of the other axioms of ZF, we can show that this implies the existence of ω. First, if we take the powerset of any infinite set x, then that powerset will contain elements which are subsets of x of every finite cardinality (among other subsets of x). Proving the existence of those finite subsets may require either the axiom of separation or the axioms of pairing and union. Then we can apply the axiom of replacement to replace each element of that powerset of x by the initial ordinal number of the same cardinality (or zero, if there is no such ordinal). The result will be an infinite set of ordinals. Then we can apply the axiom of union to that to get an ordinal greater than or equal to ω.

Independence 
The axiom of infinity cannot be proved from the other axioms of ZFC if they are consistent. (To see why, note that ZFC  Con(ZFC – Infinity) and use Gödel's Second incompleteness theorem.)

The negation of the axiom of infinity cannot be derived from the rest of the axioms of ZFC, if they are consistent. (This is tantamount to saying that ZFC is consistent, if the other axioms are consistent.) We believe this, but cannot prove it (if it is true).

Indeed, using the von Neumann universe, we can build a model of ZFC – Infinity + (¬Infinity). Note that if the axiom of the empty set is not taken as a part of this system (since it can be derived from ZF + Infinity), then the empty domain also satisfies ZFC – Infinity + ¬Infinity, as all of its axioms are universally quantified, and thus trivially satisfied if no set exists.

The cardinality of the set of natural numbers, aleph null, has many of the properties of a large cardinal. Thus the axiom of infinity is sometimes regarded as the first large cardinal axiom, and conversely large cardinal axioms are sometimes called stronger axioms of infinity.

See also 
 Peano axioms
 Finitism

References 

 Paul Halmos (1960) Naive Set Theory. Princeton, NJ: D. Van Nostrand Company. Reprinted 1974 by Springer-Verlag. .
 Thomas Jech (2003) Set Theory: The Third Millennium Edition, Revised and Expanded. Springer-Verlag. .
 Kenneth Kunen (1980) Set Theory: An Introduction to Independence Proofs. Elsevier. .
 

Axioms of set theory
Infinity